Thattai may refer to:

 Thattai (Indian food), a south Indian deep fried snack
 Thattai (instrument), an Indian percussion instrument